Mount Irvine may refer to:

 Mount Irvine (Antarctica)
 Mount Irvine, New South Wales a mountain and locality in Australia
 Mount Irvine (California), a mountain in the Sierra Nevada of California
 Mount Irvine (New York), a mountain
 Mount Irvine Bay Golf Club, a golf course in Trinidad and Tobago